Kgosiemang Khumoyarano (born 23 July 1954) is a Botswana sprinter. He competed in the men's 100 metres at the 1984 Summer Olympics.

References

1954 births
Living people
Athletes (track and field) at the 1984 Summer Olympics
Botswana male sprinters
Olympic athletes of Botswana
Place of birth missing (living people)